Mark Riley is an Australian journalist, who is Political Editor for Seven News based in Canberra.

Career
Riley started his journalism career in 1979 at The Newcastle Herald, where he covered topics including the 1989 Newcastle earthquake and the murder of Leigh Leigh. Riley's extended coverage of Leigh's murder received criticism, including from the Sydney Law Review, on the grounds that he was victim blaming Leigh for her own sexual assault and murder.
 
Riley moved  to The Sydney Morning Herald, where he worked in politics. In 1998, he was appointed New York correspondent for the Sydney Morning Herald and for Melbourne's The Age.

Riley jointly won a Walkley Award in 1999 for his part in the SMH team's coverage of East Timor's independence. Riley provided many reports for both newspapers on the 11 September terrorist attacks. Returning to Australia in 2002, Riley became The Sydney Morning Herald'''s Chief Political Correspondent. In this position he provided commentary from Parliament House.

In 2004, Riley joined the Seven Network and was appointed political editor for Seven News. He regularly provides live commentary on Sunrise and various Seven News'' bulletins.

His journalistic approach came under fire in 2011, when he was accused of "ambushing" the then Leader of the Opposition Tony Abbott.

Personal life
Riley is married to social commentator Suzanne Mostyn and they have two children.

References

Year of birth missing (living people)
Living people
Australian television journalists
The Sydney Morning Herald people